KNEM (1240 AM) is a radio station broadcasting a Country music format. Licensed to Nevada, Missouri, United States.  The station is currently owned by Harbit Communications, Inc.

The station is co-owned with and mostly simulcasts KNMO-FM, which broadcasts on 97.5 FM. Together, the stations are branded "Double K Country."

References

External links

Country radio stations in the United States
NEM